Llannewydd or Newchurch is a parish in Carmarthenshire, Wales. The church was rebuilt in 1829.

Notable people
Bridget Vaughan (1698–1779), philanthropist and the chief supporter of Griffith Jones and his system of circulating schools. She was also known as Madam Bevan.

References

Villages in Carmarthenshire